During the Swedish Deluge on May 18, 1658 near Szkudy, the Hussar Captain Samuel Komorowski fought the unresolved battle against the army of Field Marshal Robert Douglas, who was forced to resign from the attack on Żmudź.

See also 
Skuodas Manor

References 

Conflicts in 1658
Szkudy
Szkudy
Battles involving Lithuania
1658 in the Polish–Lithuanian Commonwealth